The Baku–Gazakh motorway minibus crash occurred on November 4, 2007 at about 22:30 local time (18:30 UTC) in the Qaradağ Raion of Baku, Azerbaijan, on the 51st kilometre of Baku–Gazakh motorway. The crash became the country's worst road accident of the decade.

A Mercedes-Benz minibus, carrying twenty persons on their way back from a wedding, slammed into a parked Kamaz truck, laden with stones. Fourteen people including the driver died (according to Prosecutor of Qaradağ Raion Tariel Gurbanov, four of them were children and six were women) and four were injured. The injured were taken to a military hospital in Ələt. The Qaradağ police office instituted a criminal proceeding on article 263.3 (violating traffic rules and usage of vehicles, causing death of two or more persons) of the Criminal Code of Azerbaijan.

Notes

2007 road incidents
2007 in Azerbaijan
History of Baku
Road incidents in Azerbaijan
November 2007 events in Asia
2007 disasters in Azerbaijan